Vente a Alemania, Pepe (Come to Germany, Pepe) is a Spanish film, which was directed by Pedro Lazaga.  The premiere was in 1971.

Synopsis
The films starts in a small village in Aragon, Peralejos.  Angelino (José Sacristán), who was born there, comes back from Germany.  He boasts about how rich he has become and describes the wonders of that country and its women.  He persuades Pepe (Alfredo Landa) to emigrate to that country, so he can improve his life.  However, once he is in Munich, he notices that life is harder than expected.

External links
 Vente a Alemania, Pepe in Filmaffinity
 Vente a Alemania, Pepein Nuestrocine 
 Vente a Alemania, Pepein Culturalia 
 

1971 films
Spanish comedy films
Latin-language films
1970s Spanish-language films
1971 comedy films
Films directed by Pedro Lazaga
Films set in Munich
Films set in West Germany
Films about immigration to Germany
1970s Spanish films